Ingy Norman (20 April 1911 – 7 July 1990) was an Australian rules footballer who played with Fitzroy in the Victorian Football League (VFL).

Family
The second son of Norwegian-born Jonas Mattias Elija Svehaug (1886–1968) and Sarah Ann Curran (1886–1968), Ingvald Svehaug was born in Newport, Wales (the city of his mother's birth) on 20 April 1911. The family took the anglicised surname Norman when they emigrated to Australia in 1914. He was the younger brother of fellow one-game Fitzroy player Jack Norman.

Football
After a single senior game with Fitzroy in 1938, Norman transferred to Preston where he played in the 1939 & 1940 seasons.

Notes

External links 

Ingy Norman's playing statistics from The VFA Project

1911 births
1990 deaths
VFL/AFL players born outside Australia
Australian rules footballers from Victoria (Australia)
Fitzroy Football Club players
Preston Football Club (VFA) players